Bozhidar Noev is a Bulgarian pianist. Born in Sofia, his father was a doctor his mother was austrian housewife. He has two older sisters.

He's the head of the keyboards department of Innsbruck's Conservatory, where he teaches since 1977.

References 
Rousse's March Music Days

Living people
Bulgarian classical pianists
Bulgarian expatriates in Austria
21st-century classical pianists
1942 births